Sankt Anton an der Jeßnitz is a municipality in the district of Scheibbs in Lower Austria, in northeast Austria.

Population

References 

Cities and towns in Scheibbs District